Cerithidium is a genus of sea snails, marine gastropod mollusks in the family Cerithiidae.

The genus has been used as valid for Indo-Pacific species following Hasegawa (1998), on the grounds that it is older than Clathrofenella Kuroda & Habe, 1952. However, the Mediterranean type species is a Bittium, for which reason this generic assignment should be revised. The opinion of Hasegawa (1998) and van Aartsen (2006) is followed here

Species
Species within the genus Cerithidium include:
 Cerithidium actinium Rehder, 1980
 Cerithidium australiense Thiele, 1930
 Cerithidium cerithinum (Philippi, 1849)
 Cerithidium californica
 Cerithidium diplax (Watson, 1886)
 † Cerithidium fragrans Barnard, 1963 
 Cerithidium fuscum (A. Adams, 1860)
 Cerithidium liratum Thiele, 1930
 † Cerithidium perminimum (de Boury, 1900) 
 Cerithidium perparvulum (Watson, 1886)
 † Cerithidium plebeium Lozouet, 1998 
 Cerithidium submamillatum (De Rayneval & Ponzi, 1854)
Species brought into synonymy
 Cerithidium pusillum (Jeffreys, 1856): synonym of Bittium submammillatum (de Rayneval & Ponzi, 1854) synonym of Cerithidium submammillatum (De Rayneval & Ponzi, 1854)
 Cerithidium reticulatum (A. Adams, 1860): synonym of Cerithidium fuscum (A. Adams, 1860)

References

  Hasegawa K., 1998. A review of recent Japanese species previously assigned to Eufenella and Clathrofenella (Mollusca: Gastropoda: Cerithioidea). Memoirs of the National Science Museum (Tokyo) 31: 165-186
 Lozouet, P., 1998. Nouvelles espèces de gastéropodes (Mollusca: Gastropoda) de l'Oligocène et du Miocène inférieur d'Aquitaine (sud-ouest de la France). Cossmanniana 5(3-4): 61-102
 Gofas, S.; Le Renard, J.; Bouchet, P. (2001). Mollusca, in: Costello, M.J. et al. (Ed.) (2001). European register of marine species: a check-list of the marine species in Europe and a bibliography of guides to their identification. Collection Patrimoines Naturels, 50: pp. 180–213
 van Aartsen J.J. (2006). Indo-Pacific migrants into the Mediterranean. 4. Cerithidium diplax (Watson, 1886) and Cerithidium perparvulum (Watson, 1886) (Gastropoda, Caenogastropoda). Basteria 70: 33-39

External links
 Monterosato T. A. (di) (1884). Nomenclatura generica e specifica di alcune conchiglie mediterranee. Palermo, Virzi, 152 pp
 Oliverio, Marco (2006). Gastropoda Prosobranchia Caenogastropoda, in: Revisione della Checklist della fauna marina italiana

Cerithiidae
Gastropod genera